Lunar Bird is an abstract bronze sculpture by Joan Miró. It was modeled in 1945, enlarged in 1966, and cast in 1967.

It is in the Hirshhorn Museum and Sculpture Garden.

See also
 List of public art in Washington, D.C., Ward 2

References

External links

Sculptures by Joan Miró
Modernist sculpture
1945 sculptures
Sculptures of the Smithsonian Institution
Hirshhorn Museum and Sculpture Garden
Abstract sculptures in Washington, D.C.
Outdoor sculptures in Washington, D.C.
Sculptures of birds in the United States
Moon in art